{{DISPLAYTITLE:C15H15NO2S}}
The molecular formula C15H15NO2S (molar mass: 273.35 g/mol, exact mass: 273.0823 u) may refer to:

 Armodafinil
 Modafinil

Molecular formulas